may refer to:

Mukawa, Hokkaido, a town in Japan
Mukawa, Kenya, a town in Kenya
Mu River (Hokkaidō), also called Mu-kawa, a river in Japan